Cymbiola magnifica, common name the magnificent volute, is a species of large sea snail, a marine gastropod mollusk in the family Volutidae, the volutes.

References

External links 
 Cymbiola magnifica (Gebauer, 1802)

Volutidae
Gastropods described in 1802